Ana Belen Garcia Antequera (born 30 January 1981) is a road cyclist from Spain. She represented her nation at the 2006, 2009 and 2010 UCI Road World Championships.

References

External links
 profile at Procyclingstats.com

1981 births
Spanish female cyclists
Living people
Place of birth missing (living people)
Sportspeople from the Province of Ciudad Real
Cyclists from Castilla-La Mancha